Pomeranian Voivodeship, Pomorskie Region, or Pomerania Province (Polish: Województwo pomorskie ; (Kashubian: Pòmòrsczé wòjewództwò ), is a voivodeship, or province, in northwestern Poland. The provincial capital is Gdańsk.

The voivodeship was established on January 1, 1999, out of the former voivodeships of Gdańsk, Elbląg and Słupsk, pursuant to the Polish local government reforms adopted in 1997. It is bordered by West Pomeranian Voivodeship to the west, Greater Poland and Kuyavian-Pomeranian Voivodeships to the south, Warmian-Masurian Voivodeship to the east, and the Baltic Sea to the north. It also shares a short land border with Russia (Kaliningrad Oblast), on the Vistula Spit. The voivodeship comprises most of Pomerelia (the easternmost part of historical Pomerania), as well as an area east of the Vistula River. The western part of the province, around Słupsk, belonged historically to Farther Pomerania. The central parts of the province belong to Pomerelia, including Kashubia, named after the Kashubian minority. The eastern bank of the Vistula, nowadays called Powiśle (Vistula Plains), belongs to the historical region of Prussia. 

The province is one of rich cultural heritage. The Tricity urban area, consisting of Gdańsk, Gdynia and Sopot, is one of the main cultural, commercial and educational centres of Poland. Gdańsk and Gdynia are two of the major Polish seaports, the first erected by Mieszko I of Poland in the Middle Ages, the latter built in the interwar period. Amongst the most recognisable landmarks of the region are the historic city centre of Gdańsk filled with Gothic, Renaissance and Baroque masterpieces, the Museum of the National Anthem in Będomin, located at the birthplace of Józef Wybicki, poet and politician, author of the national anthem of Poland, the largest medieval churches of Poland (the St. Mary's Church in Gdańsk and the Cathedral Basilica of the Assumption in Pelplin) and the Malbork Castle. The voivodeship also includes the narrow Hel Peninsula and the Polish half of the Vistula Spit. Other tourist destinations include Wejherowo, Sopot, Jurata, Łeba, Władysławowo, Puck, Krynica Morska, Ustka, Jastarnia, Kuźnica, Bytów and many fishing ports, lighthouses, and boats.

The name Pomerania derives from the Slavic po more, meaning "by the sea" or "on the sea".

Cities and towns 

The voivodeship contains 7 cities and 35 towns. These are listed below in descending order of population (official 2019 figures).

Administrative division 

Pomeranian Voivodeship is divided into 20 counties (powiats): 4 city counties, and 16 land counties. These are further divided into 123 gminas (communes).

The counties are listed below in order of decreasing population.

Governors

Economy 
The Gross domestic product (GDP) of the province was 29.2 billion euros in 2018, accounting for 5.9% of Polish economic output. GDP per capita adjusted for purchasing power was 20,800 euros or 69% of the EU27 average in the same year. The GDP per employee was 74% of the EU average.

Major corporations

Transport 

SKM
Gdańsk Lech Wałęsa Airport
Obwodnica Trójmiejska
Autostrada A1
Pomorska Kolej Metropolitalna

Education

Higher education

Protected areas 

Protected areas in Pomeranian Voivodeship include two National Parks and nine Landscape Parks. These are listed below.
Słowiński National Park (a UNESCO-designated biosphere reserve)
Tuchola Forest National Park (part of a UNESCO-designated biosphere reserve)
Coastal Landscape Park
Iława Lake District Landscape Park (partly in Warmian-Masurian Voivodeship)
Kashubian Landscape Park
Słupia Valley Landscape Park
Tricity Landscape Park
Tuchola Landscape Park (partly in Kuyavian-Pomeranian Voivodeship)
Vistula Spit Landscape Park
Wdydze Landscape Park
Zaborski Landscape Park

Gallery

References

External links

 Information about Pomeranian Voivodeship - official website (pl, en, ru)
 Economy brochure (en)
 The Pomorskie Voivodeship. The Greatest Tourist Attractions - Brochure (en)
 Pomerania Development Agency Co. (en)

 
Pomerania
1999 establishments in Poland
States and territories established in 1999